Una Leyenda del Rock (English: A Rock Legend), is the sixth studio album by Colombian rock music group Kraken. The album was released on December 21, 1999 by Colombian label Codiscos. "El Idioma del Rock" is the album's first single. The second single was "Fragil Al Viento."

Sound 
After an initial exploratory album, Kraken began creating music with a more progressive sound.

Track listing

References 

Kraken (band) albums
1999 albums